Oshtorinan District is a district (bakhsh) in Borujerd County, Lorestan Province, Iran. At the 2006 census, its population was 35,368, in 9,148 families.  The District has one city: Oshtorinan.

References 

Districts of Lorestan Province
Borujerd County